Mul or MUL may refer to:

 Minhaj University Lahore, a private university in Pakistan
 Mul of Kent, king of Kent
 Mul, Maharashtra, a town in the Indian state of Maharashtra
 Mul, Iran, a village in Ardabil Province, Iran
 Mul Rural LLG, Papua New Guinea
 Maruti Suzuki, formerly Maruti Udyog Limited, an Indian car maker
 Mul (fantasy race), offspring of humans and dwarves in the Dungeons & Dragons roleplaying game
 MUL 𒀯, the Sumerian for "star", see Babylonian star catalogues
 mul, ISO 639-2 and ISO 639-3 three-letter language code for multiple languages

See also
Mull (disambiguation)